Mohammed Takuti Usman is a Nigerian military officer, who is the Commander of 2 Division.

He was Commander of the Presidential Guard Brigade of Nigeria
, and was appointed by President Muhammadu Buhari on 4 August 2019 to replace the outgoing commander Brigadier General Umar Tama Musa.

Usman had served as the company commander of Guards Brigade and Adjutant Commanding Officer of 177 Battalion, he held the Chief of Staff at the Brigade for three commanders when as colonel for four years.

He was the Chief of Civil Military Affairs at the Army Headquarters in Abuja before becoming the 36th Commander for the Guards Brigade.

Notes 

Year of birth missing (living people)
Nigerian military appointments
Nigerian military leaders
Living people